A Dying Nation or Dying Peoples is a 1922 German silent historical drama film directed by Robert Reinert and starring Paul Wegener, Otto Gebühr, and Fritz Kortner. It was released in two parts Heimat in Not and Brennendes Meer.

The film's sets were designed by the art directors Kurt Dürnhöfer and Walter Reimann. It was shot at the Bavaria Studios in Munich.

Cast

References

Bibliography

External links

Films of the Weimar Republic
Films directed by Robert Reinert
German silent feature films
1922 drama films
German drama films
German black-and-white films
Films shot at Bavaria Studios
Silent drama films
1920s German films
1920s German-language films